Rakhi Ka Swayamwar was a reality show broadcast on NDTV Imagine. The show started on 29 June 2009 and ended on 2 August 2009. It was hosted by Bollywood actor Ram Kapoor. The show was filmed at various locations in Udaipur.

In the final episode ("Faisle Ki Raat") held on 2 August 2009, Rakhi Sawant selected Elesh Parujanwala, a Canadian businessman from Toronto, as her future bridegroom from among the three finalists. Although the show's original premise was that the couple would marry immediately, they have decided in favour of postponing their marriage for an indefinite period of time.

On 28 July 2009 a Jaipur judge lodged an FIR against Sawant and several NDTV executives in response to a claim by writer Gaurav Tiwari that the channel stole the idea for a swayamvar-based reality show from his website. Season 2 of the reality programme, titled Rahul Dulhaniya Le Jayega, featuring Rahul Mahajan as the groom looking for a bride concluded on 6 March 2010 where he wed Dimpy Ganguly on live national television. The third season of the reality show was called Ratan Ka Rishta and it featured Indian television actress Ratan Rajput who was looking for a groom. The third season concluded on 3 July 2011, when Ratan was engaged to Abhinav Sharma.

Contestants

After "Faisle Ki Raat" 

Originally, the winner of the show was going to marry in the final episode. But, when Rakhi did not feel ready to get married, she and Elesh got engaged during the final episode entitled "Faisle Ki Raat". After the show, It was reported that the couple were happy and had agreed to do a show called Pati Patni Aur Woh. It was during this show, that their relationship went downhill. They split up after the show because Elesh wanted Rakhi to quit her job as a Bollywood dancer and settle in Canada with him. After the split, many news and magazines reported that this was predecided and that Rakhi had done the show for money and that Elesh did the show for publicity.

References

Indian reality television series
2009 Indian television series debuts
2009 Indian television series endings
Imagine TV original programming